In avionics, ARINC 828 defines electronic flight bag (EFB) interfaces used in all types of aircraft. ARINC 828 specifies connectors, interwiring and signal types using MIL-DTL-38999 connectors which can be used to connect EFBs of all hardware classes with aircraft.

ARINC 828 combines classical aircraft interfaces like discretes, ARINC 429 or ARINC 717 buses with PC technology like USB, DVI, LVDS, and Ethernet.

ARINC 828 was first adopted by the Airlines Electronic Engineering Committee (AEEC) in September 2007. At the request of airlines and the supplier community, ARINC 828 will be updated as more airlines install EFBs.

References

External links
 aviation-ia.com

Avionics
RF connectors